Gunbarrel is an unincorporated community and a census-designated place (CDP) located in and governed by Boulder County, Colorado, United States. The CDP is a part of the Boulder, CO Metropolitan Statistical Area. The population of the Gunbarrel CDP was 9,263 at the United States Census 2010. The Boulder post office (Zip Code 80301) and Longmont and Niwot post offices (Zip Code 80503) serve the area.

Geography
Gunbarrel is northeast of the city of Boulder proper, separated by a buffer area of private agricultural lands and publicly owned open space. The buffer areas provide over two miles (3 km) of separation over changing elevations. This reduces the impact of the Boulder Municipal Airport and the Boulder County Sheriff's Department facilities (including the county jail), which are located on the southern side of the buffer.

Two reservoirs operated by the Boulder and Left Hand Irrigation Company are located in central Gunbarrel. Irrigation ditches and canals, including the Boulder and Whiterock Ditch, pass through this primarily residential area. The Twin Lakes Open Space, a large park which includes the two reservoirs and extends west along the ditch, is operated by the Boulder County Parks and Open Space Department. The park brings protected wetlands, jogging trails and green spaces directly into the urban area. The City of Boulder operates Eaton Park, adjacent to the west lake. Eaton Park includes picnic facilities, BMX jumps and additional protected wetland. Flood control facilities are integral to the reservoir and canal systems, but they do not eliminate the flood risk to adjacent development.

Natural hazards
The principal natural hazard in Gunbarrel is flooding. The county Transportation Department provides floodplain information through an online request page, free of charge for property owners in the unincorporated areas of the county, including Gunbarrel. Boulder County participates in the National Flood Insurance Program which allows some reduction in the cost of flood insurance for residents.

Climate

Demographics

Government
The Gunbarrel Public Improvement District (GPID), formerly the Gunbarrel General Improvement District, was formed by residents of Gunbarrel in 1993. At the time, county residents were concerned about the negative effects of development in the adjacent neighborhoods of the city of Boulder. They felt they needed to counterbalance the city's annexation and development powers and better manage the traffic city development was creating. The GPID is administered by the Boulder County commissioners. The GPID is a 'special district' under Colorado law, with the ability to levy taxes and incur debt. GPID uses this money to purchase open space and improve roads in the unincorporated subdivisions, consistent with their primary mission of maintaining quality of life and property values in unincorporated Gunbarrel. GPID open space lands are managed by Boulder County Parks and Open Space. A map of GPID lands can be found at the Gunbarrel Community Association website. This map also depicts the boundaries of the District's taxation area.

Transportation
The 205 bus of the RTD bus system gives service throughout Gunbarrel and into Boulder.  Roads and streets in Gunbarrel are maintained by Boulder County.

The RTD regional route J also provides a peak hours connection to the University of Colorado and Longmont.  It is intended that, once built to its planned full extent, the RTD B Line will have a station in Gunbarrel.

See also

Outline of Colorado
Index of Colorado-related articles
State of Colorado
Colorado cities and towns
Colorado census designated places
Colorado counties
Boulder County, Colorado
List of statistical areas in Colorado
Front Range Urban Corridor
North Central Colorado Urban Area
Denver-Aurora-Boulder, CO Combined Statistical Area
Boulder, CO Metropolitan Statistical Area

References

External links

Gunbarrel @ YourBoulder.com
Greater Gunbarrel
Twin Lakes Action Group
Boulder County website

Census-designated places in Boulder County, Colorado
Census-designated places in Colorado
1965 establishments in Colorado